Robert Taft may refer to:

Members of the Taft political family
 Robert Taft Sr. (c. 1640–1725), 18th century founder of the U.S. Taft political family
 Robert Taft, 2nd (1674–1748), colonial born pioneer son of the founder
 Robert A. Taft (1889–1953), United States Senator from Ohio and son of U.S. President and Supreme Court Chief Justice William Howard Taft
 Robert Taft Jr.  (1917–1993), Robert A. Taft's son, 1960s U.S. representative and 1970s U.S. Senator from Ohio
 Bob Taft (born 1942), Robert A. Taft's grandson, governor of Ohio

Others
 Robert Taft (chemist and author) (1894–1955), author and chemistry professor at the University of Kansas
 Robert F. Taft (1932–2018), American Jesuit priest and archimandrite of the Eastern Catholic Church

See also 
 Taft family, a prominent political family in the United States
 Taft (disambiguation)